Claude-Roland Videgla (born 14 May 1990) is a Togolese professional footballer who plays as a midfielder. He made one appearance for the Togo national team in 2010.

Career
Videgla began his career in Lomé with Étoile Filante.

In August 2008 he signed with Czech club 1. FK Příbram.

In January 2012 he signed a five-month contract with German team VfB Oldenburg. In June, Oldenburg announced that Videgla had extended his contract by another year.

In summer 2013 Videgla returned to 1. FK Příbram.

References

1990 births
Living people
Sportspeople from Lomé
Association football midfielders
Togolese footballers
Togo international footballers
1. FK Příbram players
VfB Oldenburg players
Togolese expatriate footballers
Togolese expatriate sportspeople in the Czech Republic
Expatriate footballers in the Czech Republic
Togolese expatriate sportspeople in Germany
Expatriate footballers in Germany
21st-century Togolese people
Chambéry SF players